Kevin Egell-Johnsen (born 13 May 2000) is a Norwegian professional footballer who plays as a defender for Odd.

Club career
Egell-Johnsen made his senior debut playing for Stathelle in the fifth tier of Norwegian football. He signed a senior contract with Odd in the summer of 2019. He broke his leg, but returned to action in the summer of 2020. He made his debut in the 2019 Norwegian Football Cup and his league debut in October 2020 against Rosenborg. In his second game, in October 2020 against Aalesund, he scored a goal and had one assist.

The start of the 2022 season, up to September, was spent on loan at Kongsvinger. Released from Odd at the end of 2022, he went on trial with Kristiansund, Aalesund and Hamkam.

References

2000 births
Living people
People from Bamble
Sportspeople from Vestfold og Telemark
Norwegian footballers
Odds BK players
Kongsvinger IL Toppfotball players
Eliteserien players
Association football defenders
Norwegian First Division players
Norwegian Second Division players
Norwegian Third Division players
Norwegian Fourth Division players